The Sons of Mesopotamia, also known as Abnaa Al-Nahrain and Bnay Nahrain, is an ethnic Assyrian political party based in northern Iraq. It was founded in 2013, and is headquartered in Erbil, Iraq. Established to further the political objectives of the Assyrian people in Iraq, the party currently holds one seat in the Kurdistan Region Parliament. According to its official website, the party exists as a renewed commitment to the Assyrian national cause, for the betterment of the Assyrian people, and to advance their struggle for legitimate rights in Iraq.

The party is named after Mesopotamia, also known as Beth Nahrain, or "the land of rivers" which was the historical location of Assyria, the ancient empire that encompassed Iraq, Syria, and parts of Iran and Turkey. The chosen name reflects on the ethnic identity of the party's members, as well as their ongoing struggle to reclaim rights for Assyrians in their ancestral lands.

The Sons of Mesopotamia is the first and only Assyrian-led political party with a female president, currently headed by Galeta Shaba.

Foundation
The Sons of Mesopotamia was founded as a splinter group after a number of its members became disillusioned with the leadership of the Assyrian Democratic Movement (ADM). In a statement issued on July 20, 2013, former members of the ADM, led by Sons of Mesopotamia founder and current board member, Shmaiel Nanno, announced the split. In the statement, since published on their website, the party acknowledges that their departure from ADM was not an easy decision, but was necessary as conditions for Assyrians in Iraq drastically worsened. The party specifies a number of reasons for the split, citing mistrust and misguided leadership under ADM's current Secretary General Yonadam Kanna, a complete monopolization of authority, continued violations against the party's principles and regulations, and disputes regarding strategy.

The split came as a devastating blow to the ADM, as several notable members—including Shmaiel Nanno, Mikhael Benjamin, Khlapieel Benjamin, and Srood Maqdasy—were among those who left the party and joined the Sons of Mesopotamia. Their departure created confusion and a loss of confidence in ADM leadership, causing friction among community members. Still, the majority of members remained with the ADM, however, the party's support has since weakened. Since the split, the Sons of Mesopotamia have earned one seat in the Kurdistan Region Parliament, which was formerly held by the Chaldean Syriac Assyrian Popular Council.

Despite the split, Sons of Mesopotamia has reaffirmed their support for ADM's stated principles and policy platform, and reference legendary ADM martyrs Yousip, Youbert, and Youkhanna in their mission statement. Many members and supporters see the political party as a realization and restoration of ADM's original mission.

Political ideology
The Sons of Mesopotamia claims to have maintained its commitment to universal Assyrian objectives to secure the rights of Assyrians in Iraq, specifically in northern Iraq and the Nineveh Plain. Their focus is geared towards addressing the increasing violence targeting Assyrians, oppressive policies implemented by the Kurdistan Regional Government (KRG), underrepresentation in the Kurdistan Region of Iraq, the rapid demographic change in historically Assyrian lands, encroachment on Assyrian lands, massive displacement of Assyrians, marginalization of Assyrians and other minority groups, lack of meaningful consideration of Assyrian objectives in KRG constitution drafting process, security, increased restrictions on the Assyrian right to assemble, and the goal of a Nineveh Plain province.

Policy
Mikhael Benjamin, Sons of Mesopotamia adviser and director of the Nineveh Center for Research and Development (NCRD), in 2014 published a proposal for a Nineveh Plain province following the Islamic State's 2014 invasion of Mosul, that left more than 200,000 Assyrians displaced. In the proposal he writes:

"But what is sure at the moment is that they have led to more deterioration in the conditions of the minorities, whether on the humanitarian level whereby all the remaining communities of the area were displaced rendering it completely void of people, or on the security and political level that became more complicated raising questions as to where would all this conflict lead to in their area at a time when it is the minorities who become first victims in all these conflicts something that makes the importance of putting an end to such conditions even more important through neutralizing the conflict there for a limited period of time through the deployment of international peace keeping forces that would impose a safe haven under international protection."

Representation
The Sons of Mesopotamia currently hold one seat in the Kurdistan Regional Government parliament, and are represented by Dr. Srood Maqdasy. He was elected to serve in 2013, winning a seat that was previously occupied by the Chaldean Syriac Assyrian Popular Council. Maqdasy is one of five Assyrians serving in the assembly.

The party is relatively unknown to the Assyrian diaspora when compared to the Assyrian Democratic Movement.

The 111-member assembly is mandated to reserve eleven seats for minorities, including Assyrians, Yezidis, Turkmens, and Shabaks.

In the Media
We've been here as an ethnicity for 6,000 years and as Christians for 1,700 years, says Dr. Srood Maqdasy, a member of the Kurdish Parliament. We have our own culture, language and tradition. If we live within other communities, all of this will be dissolved within two generations.

References

Assyrian political parties
Assyrian nationalism
Political parties in Kurdistan Region
Political parties of minorities in Iraq
Political parties established in 2013
2013 establishments in Iraqi Kurdistan